The Bund der Danziger ("Association of Danzigers") is an organization of German refugees from Danzig expelled from their homes after World War II. The organization was founded in 1946.

See also 
Expulsion of Germans after World War II
Federation of Expellees
Flight and expulsion of Germans (1944–1950)
Free City of Danzig

Landsmannschaften